Hampstead F.C. may refer to:

Harlequin F.C., an English rugby league club formed in 1866 as Hampstead F.C.
Hendon F.C., an English association football club formed as Christchurch Hampstead in 1908, named Hampstead Town from 1909 to 1926, and Hampstead F.C. from 1926 to 1933
Hampstead Heathens F.C., an English association football club active from 1868 to c. 1872, and an amateur club formed in 1975

See also
 West Hampstead F.C., an English association football club active c. 1893–1906